was a Japanese gymnast. He was the father of Yutaka Aihara, also a gymnast.

Nobuyuki competed at the 1956 Olympics and won a silver medal in floor exercise and a silver medal in the team competition. Four years later he won gold medals in these events.

Aihara took up gymnastic at the age of 15 while studying at the Nippon Sport Science University. He was coached by his future teammate Masao Takemoto. In 1964 he married Toshiko Shirasu-Aihara, a fellow gymnast. Because of an injury he missed the Tokyo Olympics that year, and soon retired to become a gymnastics coach. In 1979 he founded the Aihara Gymnastics Club.

Aihara died of pneumonia on July 16, 2013, at the age of 78.

References

1934 births
2013 deaths
Japanese male artistic gymnasts
Gymnasts at the 1956 Summer Olympics
Gymnasts at the 1960 Summer Olympics
Olympic gymnasts of Japan
Olympic gold medalists for Japan
People from Takasaki, Gunma
Nippon Sport Science University alumni
Olympic medalists in gymnastics
Deaths from pneumonia in Japan
Medalists at the 1960 Summer Olympics
Medalists at the 1956 Summer Olympics
Medalists at the World Artistic Gymnastics Championships
Olympic silver medalists for Japan

Infectious disease deaths in Japan
20th-century Japanese people
21st-century Japanese people